The 1985 Campeonato Paulista da Primeira Divisão de Futebol Profissional da Série A1 was the 84th season of São Paulo's top professional football league. São Paulo won the championship by the 14th time. Noroeste and Marília  were relegated.

Championship
The twenty teams of the championship would all play twice against each other, with the best teams of each half and the two overall best teams qualifying to the Semifinals, and the bottom two teams being relegated.

First phase

Semifinals

|}

Finals

|}

References

Campeonato Paulista seasons
Paulista